Phalaenopsis lueddemanniana is a species of orchid endemic to the Philippines.

References

External links
 
 

lueddemanniana
Plants described in 1865
Orchids of the Philippines